Harutyun Babayan (born 18 December 1975), is an Armenian politician, Member of the National Assembly of Armenia of Bright Armenia's faction and former member of the Yerevan City Council.

References 

1975 births
Living people
21st-century Armenian politicians
Politicians from Yerevan
Bright Armenia politicians